Faig Hajiyev (born on 22 May 1999) is an Azerbaijani professional footballer who plays as a defender for Turan-Tovuz in the Azerbaijan Premier League.

Career

Club
On 21 September 2019, Hajiyev made his debut in the Azerbaijan Premier League for Gabala match against Sabail.

Hajiyev was released by Gabala on 11 June 2021.

References

External links
 

1999 births
Living people
Association football defenders
Azerbaijani footballers
Azerbaijan Premier League players
Gabala FC players